Clinus exasperatus is a species of clinid which is known from only two specimens collected in the sea from among kelp, in Betty's Bay in South Africa. The specific name refers to Sophie van der Heyden's exasperation at her failure to find a second specimen.

References

exasperatus
Taxa named by Wouter Holleman
Taxa named by Sophie van der Heyden
Taxa named by Guido Zsilavecz
Fish described in 2012